Larry Bagby (born March 7, 1974) is an American actor and musician, who is best known as Ernie 'Ice' in Hocus Pocus, Larry Blaisdell in Buffy the Vampire Slayer, Pvt. Shirley "Hickey" Kendrick in Saints and Soldiers, Marshall Grant in Walk the Line, and Frank Ellis in The Young and the Restless.

Early life
Bagby was born Lawrence Bagby III in Marysville, California. His father was a member of a dance band. From 1994 to 1996, Bagby served in the Argentina Córdoba Mission of the Church of Jesus Christ of Latter-day Saints.

Career
Besides his appearances in Buffy the Vampire Slayer, Saints and Soldiers, Walk the Line, and The Young and the Restless, Bagby has also had featured appearances on television shows including CSI: Crime Scene Investigation, Cold Case, Malcolm in the Middle and JAG.  As a teenager, he acted in Airborne and Hocus Pocus.

Bagby is also a musician. In 2005, he released his first album entitled Where I Stand, followed by his 2007 EP On The Radio which includes Counting My Lucky Stars featured on a TV episode of Cold Case. Larry has performed and toured with WS Holland, Rodney Blake Powell, and Lisa Horngren of The Tennessee Three.

Filmography

Film

Television

References

External links
 
 
 Larry Bagby's Official Website

1974 births
Living people
American male film actors
American male television actors
Latter Day Saints from California
Male actors from California
American Mormon missionaries in Argentina
20th-century Mormon missionaries
People from Marysville, California